The UCI Cyclo-cross World Championships (for Women), to use the official name, is the recognized world championship for cyclo-cross and has been organized annually since 2000 by the Union Cycliste Internationale, the sport's international governing body.

Medalists

Medal counts

By country

By rider

 
UCI Cyclo-cross World Championships